These are things named after André Weil (1906 – 1998), a French mathematician.
Bergman–Weil formula
Borel–Weil theorem
Chern–Weil homomorphism
Chern–Weil theory
De Rham–Weil theorem
Weil's explicit formula
Hasse-Weil bound
Hasse–Weil zeta function, and the related Hasse–Weil L-function
Mordell–Weil group
Mordell–Weil theorem
Oka–Weil theorem
Siegel–Weil formula
Shafarevich–Weil theorem
Taniyama–Shimura–Weil conjecture, now proved as the modularity theorem
Weil algebra
Weil–Brezin Map
Weil–Châtelet group
Weil cohomology
Weil conjecture (disambiguation)
Weil conjectures
Weil conjecture on Tamagawa numbers
Weil's criterion
Weil–Deligne group scheme
Weil distribution
Weil divisor
Weil group
Weil height
Weil number
Weil pairing
Weil–Petersson metric
Weil reciprocity law
Weil representation
Weil restriction

Weil